Breaking the Silence: Truth and Lies in the War on Terror is a 2003 Carlton Television documentary written and directed by John Pilger, produced by Christopher Martin and co-directed by Steve Connelly. In the film, Pilger presents a personal view of "the truth and lies in the 'war on terror'."

Synopsis
The documentary attempts to contrast the proclaimed aims of the War on Terror with, what Pilger sees, as the humanitarian failures in countries such as Afghanistan and Iraq. It asserts that the Afghan mujahideen and Afghan Arabs including Osama bin Laden, from which later both the Taliban and Al Qaeda were created, received support from the United States and from Britain's MI6. Pilger alleges that President Jimmy Carter authorised a five-hundred million dollar programme to help set up the native Afghan mujahideen, starting as early as six months prior to the Soviet invasion into Afghanistan.

Reviews
It is referred to as an "excellent film" in the book Iraq: The Logic of Withdrawal. It won a Commendation or Honorable Mention award at a 2004 film and video festival.

Awards and festival screenings
 Gold Award, WorldMedia Festival, Hamburg
 Nominated for Best Documentary, BAFTA (British Oscar) Awards
 Honorable Mention, Society for Visual Anthropology Film Festival
 Vermont International Film Festival
 Bellingham Human Rights Film Festival
 Freedom Cinema Festival
 Istanbul International Labor Film Festival

External links

References

2003 television specials
British television documentaries
Documentary films about the Iraq War
Documentary films presented by John Pilger
War on terror